Jobe is a given name and a surname.

Jobe or Jobé may also refer to:

 Jobe Township, Oregon County, Missouri, United States, an inactive township
 Jobe, Missouri, United States, an unincorporated community
 Jobé, a subgroup of the Jaega Native American tribe, also a town of the Jaega

See also
 Job (disambiguation)